Mohamed Ali Hafiz of the  Federation for Scouts and Girl Guides served on the World Scout Committee of the World Organization of the Scout Movement from 1957 to 1963 and again from 1965 to 1971.

In 1957, an Arab Scout Bureau was established, with Hafiz as first Secretary-General.

In 1963, Hafez was awarded the Bronze Wolf, the only distinction of the World Organization of the Scout Movement, awarded by the World Scout Committee for exceptional services to world Scouting.

References

Dr. László Nagy, 250 Million Scouts, The World Scout Foundation and Dartnell Publishers, 1985, complete list through 1981
Scouting Round the World, John S. Wilson, first edition, Blandford Press 1959 p. 275, p. 282

External links

Recipients of the Bronze Wolf Award
World Scout Committee members
Possibly living people
Year of birth missing
Scouting and Guiding in Egypt